Andreas Weißgerber (10 January 1900 – 26 December 1941), also known as Chanosch Ben Mosche Weißgerber, was an Austrian-Hungarian violinist.

Life 
Weissgerber came from a Jewish family with roots in Sagadora near Czernowitz in Bukovina; a place at the easternmost end of the k.u.k. Monarchy famous for its miracle rabbis. The Weissgerbers settled in the Greek town of Volos (Βόλος), where Andreas was born on 10 January 1900, shortly before they moved on to Smyrna, today's Turkish Izmir Andreas received his first violin lessons in Athens.

A violin-playing prodigy, he performed in the major cities of the Ottoman Empire at the age of seven; he once played in Constantinople for the Sultan Abdul Hamid II, who gave him five parrots as a reward. Weissgerber attended the music academies of Budapest and Vienna, most recently studying at the Musikhochschule in Berlin. In Budapest, his teacher was Jenő Hubay (1858–1937), with whom also József Szigeti, Emil Telmányi, Jenő Ormándy and Paul Godwin had enjoyed lessons. In Berlin, it was Issay Barmas (1872–1946), a native of Odessa, who taught at the Stern Conservatory cf. Frick ; for example, the violinist and chapel director Dajos Béla also studied with Barmas.

In the 1920s, Weissgerber made concert tours through the Weimar Republic, during which the composer Rudolf Wagner-Régeny accompanied him at the piano. They took him to the smallest provincial towns. He was also a popular guest on German radio stations. Important artists of his time such as Lovis Corinth, Max Liebermann and Max Slevogt made portraits of Weissgerber. Their appearance in the contemporary illustrated press documented his popularity.

With Eugen d'Albert at the piano, he made recordings for Odeon. He also recorded for VOX. There, Karol Szreter was his piano accompanist. He, his brother Joseph on cello and Claudio Arrau at the piano could be heard as the "Andreas Weißgerber-Trio".

After the Machtergreifung by the Nazis, when he was only allowed to perform at events of the Kulturbund Deutscher Juden, he played for the label "Lukraphon", which was exclusively for Jewish artists. The owner was called Moritz Lewin and had his business premises in Berlin at Friedrichstrasse 208 and Grenadierstrasse 28, cf. Lotz. There, Kurt Sanderling sat at the piano. As late as 1935, he gave a concert together with the pianist Richard Goldschmied (1880–1941) at the Jewish Cultural Association in Hamburg, at which works by Igor Stravinsky were performed, among others, whose music was by then considered degenerate music.

In 1936, he followed his two years younger brother Joseph (1902–1954), who had played as principal cellist with the Dresden Philharmonic and had already left Germany in 1933, to emigrate to Palestine. Both have been invited by Bronisław Huberman to play in the symphony orchestra of Palestine, later the Israel Philharmonic Orchestra. Weissgerber is considered a co-founder of this orchestra, of which he became concertmaster.

Weißgerber appeared in a short film Paganini in Venice in 1929.

A sound film, Shir Ivri (Hebrew Melody), (1935) which was produced at this time with his participation for the Reichsverband der jüdischen Kulturbünde in Deutschland, had only recently been found among his brother's estate and has since been re-released.

The Riga native composer Marc Lavry wrote a concerto for violin and orchestra (op. 78) for Weissgerber with the movements Allegro Moderato (Marcia), Andante and Allegro Assai, which he performed with the Palestine Radio Symphony Orchestra on 20 June 1939.

Weissgerber died of a heart attack on 26 December 1941 in Tel-Aviv aged 41.

Recordings

For Odeon 
 1921: Zigeunerweisen (Pablo de Sarasate)
 1923: Andante Sostenuto aus der C-dur Sonate (Mozart) (Odeon)
 1923: Scherzo und Rondo aus der Frühlingssonate (Beethoven)
 1923: Two movements (the Rondo is heavily cut) from Beethoven's Violin Sonata in F, Op 24
 unknown year: Ungarische Tänze Nr. 2 and 5
 unknown year: Csárdás / Hubay.

For Vox 
 Trio, B-Dur, op. 11 : Adagio / Beethoven
 Trio, B-Dur, op. 11 : Thema mit Variationen / Beethoven.
 Trio, B-Dur, op. 99 : Scherzo / Schubert.
 Trio, Es-Dur, op. 99 : Scherzo / Fr. Schubert.

For Lukraphon 
 Hebräische Melodie (Achron)
 Andantino (Martini)
 Csárdás (Hubay)
 Spanish danse from the opera La Vida Breve (Manuel de Falla)

Reissues 
 Horst J.P. Bergmeier, Ejal Jakob Eisler, Rainer E. Lotz: Vorbei. Dokumentation jüdischen Musiklebens in Berlin, 1933–1938. (Beyond Recall. A record of Jewish musical life in Nazi Berlin, 1933–1938). Bear Family, Holste-Oldendorf 2001, .
 CD “EUGEN D'ALBERT (1864–1932)” by Symposium Records, 4, Arden Close, Overstrand, North Norfolk NR27 0PH, U.K. (Symposium Catalogue No: 1146, Release Date: Aug 01, 1994, replaces CD1046) enthält von Weissgerber / D'Albert die Odeon-Aufnahmen Andante Sostenuto aus der C-dur Sonate (Mozart) und Scherzo und Rondo aus der Frühlingssonate (Beethoven), both from 1923.
 Doppel-CD “The Centaur Pianist”: Eugen d'Albert, Complete Studio Recordings, 1910–1928. label: Arbiter ; Release date 28 February 2006; Katalognr.: 147; enthält auf CD 2 Aufnahmen mit Andreas Weissgerber: track 17 : Violin Sonata In C, K. 296: Andante Sostenuto (Mozart), track 18 : Violin Sonata In F, Op. 24: I. Scherzo (Beethoven), track 19 : Violin Sonata In F, Op. 24: II. Rondo (Beethoven)

Further reading 
 Friedrich Frick: Kleines Biographisches Lexikon der Violinisten. Vom Anfang des Violinspiels bis zum Beginn des 20. Jahrhunderts. Books on Demand, 2009, .
 "Künstler am Rundfunk" – Ein Taschen-Album der Zeitschrift Der deutsche Rundfunk, unseren Lesern gewidmet. Verlag Rothgiesser und Diesing, Berlin 1932.
 Ronny Loewy : ‚Nur in geschlossenen Veranstaltungen vor Angehörigen der jüdischen Rasse‘. Palästina-Filme im Jüdischen Kulturbund 1935–1938. In Peter Zimmermann (ed.): Geschichte des dokumentarischen Films in Deutschland. Vol. 3: Peter Zimmermann, Kay Hoffmann (ed.): Drittes Reich (1933–1945). Reclam, Leipzig 2005, .
 Rainer E. Lotz, Axel Weggen: Discographie der Judaica-Aufnahmen. (Deutsche National-Discographie, Serie 6, vol. 1), Birgit Lotz, Bonn 2006, .
 Barbara von der Lühe: Die Musik war unsere Rettung. Die deutschsprachigen Gründungsmitglieder des Palestine Orchestra. (Schriftenreihe wissenschaftlicher Abhandlungen des Leo-Baeck-Instituts, vol. 58). Verlag Mohr Siebeck, 1998, .
 Jascha Nemtsov: Der Zionismus in der Musik. Jèudische Musik und nationale Idee. (Jèudische Musik, Studien und Quellen zur jüdischen Musikkultur, vol. 6). Otto Harrassowitz Verlag, Wiesbaden 2009, .
 Gregor von Rezzori: "Memoiren eines Antisemiten". Ein Roman in fünf Erzählungen. Bertelsmann Verlag, 1979, .
 Jonathan Scheiner: "La Cucaracha" im Synagogenkeller. Eine imposante Edition dokumentiert das musikalische Schaffen des Jüdischen Kulturbundes 1933–1938. Rezension über die Edition "Vorbei / Beyond Recall" bei Bear Family. (online at: leo-baeck.org)
 Theo Stengel, Herbert Gerigk: Lexikon der Juden in der Musik. With a list of titles of Jewish works. Compiled by order of the Reichsleitung der NSDAP on the basis of official, party-officially examined documents. (Publications of the Institute of NSDAP zur Erforschung der Judenfrage, vol. 2). Bernhard Hahnefeld, Berlin 1941, .
 
 Hartwig Vens: Total Recall. Review of the Vorbei / Beyond Recall. edition by Bear Family.

References

External links 
 

Hungarian classical violinists
Male classical violinists
Concertmasters
Jewish emigrants from Nazi Germany
1900 births
1941 deaths
Musicians from Volos
20th-century Hungarian male musicians